The 2015–16 Vanderbilt Commodores men's basketball team represented Vanderbilt University in the 2015–16 NCAA Division I men's basketball season. This was Kevin Stallings' 17th and final year as the Vanderbilt head coach. The Commodores played their home games at Memorial Gymnasium in Nashville, Tennessee, as a member of the Southeastern Conference. They finished the season 19–14, 11–7 in SEC play to finish in a three way tie for third place. They lost in the second round of the SEC tournament to Tennessee. They received an at-large bid to the NCAA tournament where they lost in the First Four to Wichita State.

On March 27, 2017, head coach Kevin Stallings resigned to become the head coach at Pittsburgh. He finished at Vanderbilt with a 17-year record of 332–220. Shortly thereafter, the school hired Valparaiso head coach Bryce Drew as head coach.

Previous season
The 2014–15 Commodores finished the season 21–14, 9–9 in SEC play to finish at seventh place in the SEC standings. As the #7 seed, they lost in the second round of the SEC tournament to Tennessee. Vanderbilt participated in the National Invitation Tournament as an #5 seed, defeating Saint Mary's and South Dakota State before falling to the eventual NIT champion, the Stanford Cardinal, in the quarterfinals, marking the end of the Commodores' season.

Before the season

Departures

Class of 2015 signees

Roster

Schedule and results

|-
!colspan=9 style="background:#000000; color:#BDAE79;"| Regular season

|-
!colspan=9 style="background:#000000; color:#BDAE79;"| SEC tournament

|-
!colspan=9 style="background:#000000; color:#BDAE79;"| NCAA tournament
|-

See also
2015–16 NCAA Division I men's basketball season

References

Vanderbilt
Vanderbilt Commodores basketball
Vanderbilt
Vander
Vanderbilt Commodores men's basketball seasons